Events in the year 2005 in Germany.

Incumbents
President: Horst Köhler
Chancellor:
Gerhard Schröder (until 22 November 2005)
Angela Merkel (from 22 November 2005)

Events
 20 January - German Visa Affair 2005
 7 February - Honor killing of Hatun Sürücü
 10–20 February - 55th Berlin International Film Festival
 12 February -Bundesvision Song Contest 2005
 12 March - Germany in the Eurovision Song Contest 2005
 12 April - Ennepetal hostage taking
 30 May - Allianz Arena in Munich is opened.
 2 September - SAP Arena in Mannheim is opened.
 16–21 August - World Youth Day 2005 in Cologne
 22 November - The First Merkel cabinet led by Angela Merkel was sworn in.
 Date unknown: German company HypoVereinsbank was acquired by Italian company UniCredit Bank AG.

Elections
 German federal election, 2005
 North Rhine-Westphalia state election, 2005
 Schleswig-Holstein state election, 2005

Sport
 Bundesliga scandal (2005)
 2004–05 Bundesliga
 2004–05 2. Bundesliga
 2005 FIFA Confederations Cup
 2004–05 Deutsche Eishockey Liga season
 2005 German Grand Prix
 2005 European Grand Prix
 2005 German motorcycle Grand Prix
 2005 BMW Open

Deaths

14 January - Rudolph Moshammer, German fashion designer (born 1940)
3 February - Ernst Mayr, German biologist (born 1904)
21 February - Horst Drinda, German actor (born 1927)
24 February - Hans-Jürgen Wischnewski, German politician (born 1922)
6 March - Hans Bethe, German nuclear physicist (born 1906)
7 March - Walter Arendt, German politician (born 1925)
15 March - Konrad Hesse, German judge (born 1919)
1 April - Harald Juhnke, German actor and comedian (born 1929)
16 April - Volker Vogeler, German film director (born 1930)
2 May — Hermann Dörnemann, German supercentenarian (born 1893)
19 May - Paul Schneider-Esleben, German architect (born 1915)
8 July  Peter Boenisch, German journalist (born 1927)
14 July - Tilly Fleischer, German athlete (born 1911)
28 August - Hans Clarin, German actor (born 1929)
4 September - Carl-August Fleischhauer, judge (born 1930)
12 September  Helmut Baierl, German playwright (born 1926)
20 October - Rudi Felgenheier, motorcycle race (born 1930)
1 December - Karin Himboldt, German actress (born 1920)

See also
2005 in German television

References

 
Years of the 21st century in Germany
2000s in Germany
Germany
Germany